Wally Taylor may refer to:

 Wally Taylor (baseball) (1864–1922), baseball player and manager
 Wally Taylor (footballer) (1926–2005), English footballer
 Wally Taylor (actor) (1930–2012), American actor